Asbjørn Herteig (15 February 1919 – 2 October 2006) was a Norwegian archeologist. He was the first curator at the Bryggen Museum and affiliated with the University of Bergen.

Biography
He was born in Hadsel in Nordland, Norway.  In 1952, he took his  magister degree in archeology at the University of Oslo.  Through this work, Herteig was a pioneer in the field of Norwegian medieval era archeology. Herteig worked with excavations of Kaupanger on the island of Veøya.  In particular, he was associated with the excavations of Bryggen in Bergen. Herteig was one of the co-founders of and organisers of Bryggens Museum. He also played a crucial role in the founding of  Friends of Bryggen.

He was decorated Knight, First Class of the Order of St. Olav in 1970. Until 1999,  Herteig was director of the  Bryggen Foundation (Stiftelsen Bryggen). From 1960 until his death in 2006, he resided at Christinegård in the Bergen neighborhood of Sandviken.

Selected works
Bryggen i Bergen (1961) 
The Bryggen Papers (1985)
The Bryggen Papers (1985)
A Medieval Brewery (1988)
The Buildings at Bryggen (1990 - 1991)

See also
Bryggen inscriptions

References

Other sources
 Excavation of 'Bryggen', the old Hanseatic Wharf in Bergen

External links
Listing of Publications (Regesta Imperii)
Friends of Bryggen website
Stiftelsen Bryggen website

1919 births
2006 deaths
People from Hadsel
Archaeologists from Bergen
University of Oslo alumni
Academic staff of the University of Bergen
Recipients of the St. Olav's Medal
20th-century archaeologists